Wang Jun (born 1 July 1990) is a Chinese footballer who plays for as a left-footed midfielder.

Club career
Wang Jun started his professional football career in 2008 when he was promoted to Jiangsu Sainty's first team squad. After a stellar 2008 season, he entered Nanjing University. In 2014, Wang joined his hometown club Guizhou Zhicheng. He was the key player of Guizhou to promoted back to China League One in 2014 season and promotion to Chinese Super League in 2016 season. He made his Super League debut on 8 April 2017 in a 0–0 home draw against Tianjin Teda, coming on as a substitute for Chang Feiya in the 77th minute.

Career statistics
.

References

External links
 

1990 births
Living people
Chinese footballers
Association football midfielders
People from Guiyang
Footballers from Guizhou
Chinese Super League players
China League One players
China League Two players
Jiangsu F.C. players
Guizhou F.C. players